The 4th Shanghai International Film Festival was held between October 22 and October 31, 1999. Like the previous year, the Film Festival was divided into four activities:
Golden Cup International Film Competition
International Film Panorama
International Film and TV Market
Retrospectives with Seminar

338 films were entered.

The Turkish film Propaganda was named the winner of the Golden Goblet.

Jury
Wu Yigong, director (China)
Paolo Virzì, director (Italy)
Yasuo Furuhata, director (Japan)
Carole Bouquet, actress (France)
Park Kwang-su, director (South Korea)
Stanislav Rostotsky, director (Russia)
Zheng Dongtian, director (China)

In competition

Awards

Golden Goblet
Best Film- Propaganda (Turkey)
Silver Cup for Best Film- The Prompter (Norway)
Best Director- Yoji Yamada (for The New Voyage) (Japan)
Best Actor- Ahmad Zaki for Laugh, So the Photo Will Be Beautiful (Egypt)
Best Actress- Ai Liya for Genghis Khan (China)
Best Music- Beastie Girl (Austria)
Best Technology- A Midsummer Night's Dream (USA)

Special Jury Award
The Lunatics' Ball (director, Michael Thorp) (New Zealand)

External links
Archives of the Shanghai International Film Festival
4th SIFF at the Internet Movie Database

Shanghai
Film
Shanghai International Film Festival
1990s in Shanghai